The Chemin des Révoires is a pathway within Les Révoires district of the Principality of Monaco. It is the highest point in Monaco.

Features
The highest point in Monaco, at 162 metres (528 feet) above sea level, is situated on this pathway, on the slopes of Mont Agel, a mountain whose summit is situated on the French side. A proportion of the Principality's territory is very steep, being geographically part of the Alps which extend to the Mediterranean Sea.

See also
Geography of Monaco

References

External links
 Chemin des Révoires, Archeo Alpi Maritimi.

Transport in Monaco
Geography of Monaco
France–Monaco border crossings
Highest points of countries